Mesoporos is a genus of dinoflagellates belonging to the family Prorocentraceae.

Species:

Mesoporos adriaticus 
Mesoporos adriatus 
Mesoporos asymmetricus 
Mesoporos bisimpressus 
Mesoporos globulus 
Mesoporos parthasarathicus 
Mesoporos perforatus

References

Dinophyceae
Dinoflagellate genera